Charles Melton Wines is an Australian winery based in Tanunda, within the Barossa Valley wine region of South Australia.

History

Charles Melton was first introduced to winemaking as a career at Hurlstone Agricultural High School.

Melton worked as a cellar hand at Krondorf Wines between 1974 and 1976, before moving to Saltram Wines to work with Andrew Wigan and Peter Lehmann.

In 1979 Saltram was sold to Seagram and Melton followed Lehmann to work at the newly established Peter Lehmann Wines.

Melton continued work at Peter Lehmann Wines until 1986 when he and his wife Virginia established Charles Melton Wines.

Charles Melton has been credited as "single-handedly reviving the grenache grape in Australia".

On 20 October 2007, Melton was inducted into the "Barons of the Barossa", an organisation that recognises people that have made a significant contribution to the Barossa Valley wine community.

Wines

About 15,000 cases of wine are produced each vintage.

The best known wine produced by Charles Melton is the Nine Popes. It is a blend of Grenache, Shiraz and Mourvedre. The first vintage of this wine was produced in 1988, and it was the first GSM blend made in the Barossa Valley. Langton's Classification of Australian Wine placed this wine at the level of "Excellent" in 2000 and "Distinguished" in 2005 and 2010.

A rosé style wine made from Grenache, and named Rose of Virginia after his wife "is regarded as one of Australia's best roses".

See also
List of wineries in the Barossa Valley

References

External links
Official website

Wineries in South Australia
Food and drink companies established in 1986
Australian companies established in 1986